Hasan Adigüzel (born 3 April 2000) is a Turkish footballer who plays as a midfielder for Serik Belediyespor.

Professional career
A youth product of Akhisarspor, Hasan Ali made his professional debut for them in a 3-3 Turkish Cup tie on 30 November 2016, at the age of 16. He made his Süper Lig debut in a 0-0 tie with Kayserispor on 21 January 2017.

On 10 May 2018, Hasan Ali helped Akhisar Belediyespor win their first professional trophy, the 2017–18 Turkish Cup.

Honours
Akhisarspor
 Turkish Cup (1): 2017-18

References

External links
 
 

2000 births
People from Alaşehir
Living people
Turkish footballers
Turkey youth international footballers
Association football midfielders
Akhisarspor footballers
Süper Lig players
TFF First League players
TFF Second League players
Competitors at the 2018 Mediterranean Games
Mediterranean Games competitors for Turkey
21st-century Turkish people